The Braille pattern dots-15 is a 6-dot braille cell with the top left and middle right dots raised, or an 8-dot braille cell with the top left and right upper-middle dots raised. It is represented by the Unicode code point U+2811, and in Braille ASCII with E.

Unified Braille

In unified international braille, the braille pattern dots-15 is used to represent unrounded, near-mid, front vowels, such as /e/ or /ɛ/. It is also used for the number 5.

Table of unified braille values

Other braille

Plus dots 7 and 8

Related to Braille pattern dots-15 are Braille patterns 157, 158, and 1578, which are used in 8-dot braille systems, such as Gardner-Salinas and Luxembourgish Braille.

Related 8-dot kantenji patterns

In the Japanese kantenji braille, the standard 8-dot Braille patterns 26, 126, 246, and 1246 are the patterns related to Braille pattern dots-15, since the two additional dots of kantenji patterns 015, 157, and 0157 are placed above the base 6-dot cell, instead of below, as in standard 8-dot braille.

Kantenji using braille patterns 26, 126, 246, or 1246

This listing includes kantenji using Braille pattern dots-15 for all 6349 kanji found in JIS C 6226-1978.

  - 月

Variants and thematic compounds

  -  selector 6 + ら/月  =  胡
  -  数 + ら/月/#5  =  五
  -  比 + ら/月  =  亙

Compounds of 月

  -  ろ/十 + ら/月  =  有
  -  つ/土 + ら/月  =  堕
  -  を/貝 + ら/月  =  賄
  -  さ/阝 + ら/月  =  随
  -  ⺼ + ら/月  =  髄
  -  な/亻 + ろ/十 + ら/月  =  侑
  -  囗 + ろ/十 + ら/月  =  囿
  -  う/宀/#3 + ろ/十 + ら/月  =  宥
  -  さ/阝 + ろ/十 + ら/月  =  陏
  -  せ/食 + ろ/十 + ら/月  =  鮪
  -  龸 + ら/月  =  育
  -  む/車 + ら/月  =  轍
  -  ゆ/彳 + ら/月  =  徹
  -  て/扌 + ら/月  =  撤
  -  ら/月 + ら/月  =  朋
  -  や/疒 + ら/月  =  崩
  -  ら/月 + せ/食  =  鵬
  -  ま/石 + ら/月 + ら/月  =  硼
  -  く/艹 + ら/月 + ら/月  =  萠
  -  つ/土 + ら/月 + ら/月  =  堋
  -  ゆ/彳 + ら/月 + ら/月  =  弸
  -  ら/月 + ぬ/力  =  前
  -  火 + ら/月  =  煎
  -  ぬ/力 + ら/月 + ぬ/力  =  剪
  -  ち/竹 + ら/月 + ぬ/力  =  箭
  -  む/車 + ら/月 + ぬ/力  =  翦
  -  か/金 + ら/月  =  骨
  -  氷/氵 + ら/月  =  滑
  -  心 + か/金 + ら/月  =  榾
  -  け/犬 + か/金 + ら/月  =  猾
  -  ま/石 + か/金 + ら/月  =  磆
  -  か/金 + か/金 + ら/月  =  骭
  -  の/禾 + か/金 + ら/月  =  骰
  -  数 + か/金 + ら/月  =  髏
  -  む/車 + か/金 + ら/月  =  髑
  -  日 + ら/月  =  明
  -  く/艹 + 日 + ら/月  =  萌
  -  ら/月 + の/禾  =  能
  -  ら/月 + 心  =  態
  -  ら/月 + 火  =  熊
  -  す/発 + ら/月 + 火  =  羆
  -  す/発 + ら/月  =  罷
  -  て/扌 + す/発 + ら/月  =  擺
  -  よ/广 + ら/月  =  厭
  -  る/忄 + ら/月  =  惰
  -  つ/土 + つ/土 + ら/月  =  墮
  -  き/木 + さ/阝 + ら/月  =  橢
  -  き/木 + 宿 + ら/月  =  楕
  -  ⺼ + ⺼ + ら/月  =  膸
  -  さ/阝 + 宿 + ら/月  =  隋
  -  さ/阝 + さ/阝 + ら/月  =  隨
  -  ⺼ + 宿 + ら/月  =  髓
  -  ほ/方 + ら/月  =  望
  -  い/糹/#2 + ら/月  =  絹
  -  す/発 + い/糹/#2 + ら/月  =  羂
  -  ふ/女 + 宿 + ら/月  =  娟
  -  る/忄 + 宿 + ら/月  =  悁
  -  て/扌 + 宿 + ら/月  =  捐
  -  け/犬 + 宿 + ら/月  =  狷
  -  に/氵 + 龸 + ら/月  =  涓
  -  ら/月 + 宿 + せ/食  =  鵑
  -  ん/止 + ら/月  =  肯
  -  た/⽥ + ら/月  =  胄
  -  ぬ/力 + ら/月  =  脅
  -  と/戸 + ら/月  =  覇
  -  ち/竹 + 宿 + ら/月  =  霸
  -  ら/月 + か/金  =  勝
  -  ら/月 + 氷/氵  =  散
  -  て/扌 + ら/月 + 氷/氵  =  撒
  -  い/糹/#2 + ら/月 + 氷/氵  =  繖
  -  ら/月 + ゐ/幺  =  服
  -  ち/竹 + ら/月 + ゐ/幺  =  箙
  -  ら/月 + は/辶  =  朔
  -  ひ/辶 + ら/月 + は/辶  =  遡
  -  る/忄 + ら/月 + は/辶  =  愬
  -  き/木 + ら/月 + は/辶  =  槊
  -  に/氵 + ら/月 + は/辶  =  溯
  -  ら/月 + け/犬  =  朕
  -  ら/月 + け/犬 + に/氵  =  滕
  -  ら/月 + け/犬 + ゐ/幺  =  縢
  -  ふ/女 + も/門 + ら/月  =  嫺
  -  や/疒 + も/門 + ら/月  =  癇
  -  い/糹/#2 + も/門 + ら/月  =  繝
  -  ら/月 + や/疒  =  朗
  -  ら/月 + き/木  =  期
  -  ら/月 + ま/石  =  朧
  -  ら/月 + も/門  =  胞
  -  ら/月 + と/戸  =  脹
  -  ら/月 + し/巿  =  腑
  -  ら/月 + う/宀/#3  =  膨
  -  ら/月 + な/亻  =  臆
  -  ら/月 + す/発  =  臓
  -  ら/月 + ら/月 + す/発  =  臟
  -  ら/月 + ろ/十  =  臘
  -  ら/月 + え/訁  =  謄
  -  ら/月 + そ/馬  =  騰
  -  に/氵 + ら/月 + 氷/氵  =  潸
  -  ら/月 + 比 + へ/⺩  =  朏
  -  ら/月 + 比 + や/疒  =  朖
  -  ら/月 + 宿 + き/木  =  朞
  -  ら/月 + 宿 + そ/馬  =  朦
  -  く/艹 + 宿 + ら/月  =  臈

Compounds of 胡

  -  に/氵 + ら/月  =  湖
  -  心 + selector 6 + ら/月  =  楜
  -  へ/⺩ + 宿 + ら/月  =  瑚
  -  の/禾 + 宿 + ら/月  =  糊
  -  む/車 + selector 6 + ら/月  =  蝴
  -  せ/食 + selector 6 + ら/月  =  餬

Compounds of 五 and 亙

  -  ら/月/#5 + れ/口  =  吾
  -  れ/口 + ら/月 + れ/口  =  唔
  -  囗 + ら/月 + れ/口  =  圄
  -  う/宀/#3 + ら/月 + れ/口  =  寤
  -  日 + ら/月 + れ/口  =  晤
  -  心 + ら/月 + れ/口  =  梧
  -  そ/馬 + ら/月 + れ/口  =  牾
  -  へ/⺩ + ら/月 + れ/口  =  珸
  -  ゆ/彳 + ら/月 + れ/口  =  衙
  -  ん/止 + ら/月 + れ/口  =  齬
  -  な/亻 + 数 + ら/月  =  伍

Other compounds

  -  う/宀/#3 + ら/月  =  官
  -  き/木 + ら/月  =  棺
  -  せ/食 + ら/月  =  館
  -  ち/竹 + ら/月  =  管
  -  心 + ら/月  =  菅
  -  い/糹/#2 + う/宀/#3 + ら/月  =  綰
  -  せ/食 + 宿 + ら/月  =  舘
  -  し/巿 + ら/月  =  師
  -  け/犬 + ら/月  =  獅
  -  ち/竹 + し/巿 + ら/月  =  篩
  -  せ/食 + し/巿 + ら/月  =  鰤
  -  は/辶 + ら/月  =  遣
  -  え/訁 + は/辶 + ら/月  =  譴
  -  か/金 + は/辶 + ら/月  =  鑓
  -  ゐ/幺 + ら/月  =  縋
  -  ひ/辶 + ら/月  =  追
  -  か/金 + ひ/辶 + ら/月  =  鎚
  -  こ/子 + 宿 + ら/月  =  耜
  -  ふ/女 + ら/月  =  媼
  -  そ/馬 + ら/月  =  蓋
  -  そ/馬 + 宿 + ら/月  =  盖
  -  そ/馬 + 龸 + ら/月  =  葢
  -  ら/月 + た/⽥  =  留
  -  心 + ら/月 + た/⽥  =  榴
  -  に/氵 + ら/月 + た/⽥  =  溜
  -  へ/⺩ + ら/月 + た/⽥  =  瑠
  -  や/疒 + ら/月 + た/⽥  =  瘤
  -  ち/竹 + ら/月 + た/⽥  =  霤
  -  せ/食 + う/宀/#3 + ら/月  =  鰡
  -  せ/食 + 龸 + ら/月  =  餾
  -  ち/竹 + 龸 + ら/月  =  籀
  -  ら/月 + を/貝  =  貿
  -  ら/月 + ら/月 + た/⽥  =  畄
  -  い/糹/#2 + ら/月 + た/⽥  =  緇
  -  む/車 + ら/月 + た/⽥  =  輜
  -  か/金 + ら/月 + た/⽥  =  錙
  -  せ/食 + ら/月 + た/⽥  =  鯔
  -  て/扌 + ら/月 + か/金  =  捷
  -  氷/氵 + ら/月 + た/⽥  =  澑
  -  に/氵 + 宿 + ら/月  =  澗

Notes

Braille patterns